Bare Lit Festival is an annual literature festival featuring writers of colour held in London, UK, and taking place over two days every Spring. It was founded in 2016 by Samantha Asumadu, Mend Mariwany, Henna Zamurd-Butt and Samira Sawlani. The event is notable as the UK's first crowdfunded festival to take place, raising over £7700 by 291 individual supporters. Additionally, according to The Guardian, the festival was the first in the UK to focus on minority writers.

In 2017, Bare Lit was supported by organisations including Spread the Word, The Royal Literary Fund, Apples & Snakes and Arvon. The festival was noted in The New York Times as a collection of panels, presentations, and conversations aimed to discuss issues relevant to Black and Asian authors and writers.

The inaugural festival was held from 26 to 28 February at the Free Word Centre and the Betsey Trotwood in Farringdon, London, and included more than 30 writers of international backgrounds.

The festival took place a second time in April 2017 and featured over 60 writers, with panelists discussing topics such as food writing, Erotica literature and the art and craft of editing.

References

External links 
 Bare Lit Festival official site 
 "Bare Lit Festival: Building a Community", Media Diversified, 6 March 2016.

Literary festivals in England
Festivals in London